Westerleigh is a clustered village and civil parish (which includes Henfield) in South Gloucestershire, England, it contains sources of the Frome and has an endpoint of the Frome Valley Walkway. In the south it includes a steep hill of its own  from the crest of the Cotswold hills which is designated an AONB.

Background
The village is first mentioned in a Saxon document of 887AD. At that time it was probably just a clearing in the woods with possibly a wooden church. Westerleigh is mentioned in the Domesday Book of 1086.

In medieval times the village would probably have been a green with the houses and church around it, and prosperous. The northern wall and porch of St James church is from the 13th century, as is the carved stone pulpit. The church was rebuilt in the perpendicular style, with the tower (once used as the village lock up) added at a later date. The 700th anniversary was celebrated in 2004.

By 1600 the village supported a shoemaker, a blacksmith, a sawyer, a flour mill, a malt house and two public houses. In 1617, John Crandall was baptised to James and Eleanor Crandall at St. James the Great church, and became one of the founders of Westerly, Rhode Island, United States.

The discovery of coal in 1660 provided employment for the villagers, with further finds at Coalpit Heath and Parkfield providing more employment. The mines closed in the last century, when the coal was exhausted.

By 1876 occupations in the village included farmers, a bootmaker, shopkeepers, innkeepers, butchers, a plasterer, a blacksmith, a wheelwright, a market gardener and a carrier. At the end of the 19th century many of the old houses were demolished. At the beginning of the 20th century, the railway and mining provided most of the work. Now residents find work in nearby Yate, Chipping Sodbury and Bristol, and in the village itself.

Governance
An electoral ward in the same name exists. This ward stretches from Dodington in the east, through 'Westerleigh'. The total population for the ward at the 2011 census was 3,755.

Amenities
The village has two public houses: the New Inn and Ye Olde Inn. As well as Wot Not second-hand shop, and two garages. The  village shop has now closed.

Transport
In the late 18th century roads were built to Downend. The Great Western and Midland Railways were constructed in the 19th century. Westerleigh Junction was a crossing point of east-west and north-south main lines. In particular it is considered to be the present end of the line from milepost zero at Derby. Westerleigh formerly had a goods depot on the Bristol & Gloucester Railway. Demolished in the 1960s as part of the Beeching cuts, the site is now the home of one of Murco's oil storage terminals.

Location grid

References

External links

Westerleigh village website
Westerleigh Parish Council website

Villages in South Gloucestershire District
Civil parishes in Gloucestershire